The Italy national Diving team represents Italy in International Diving competitions such as Olympic Games or World Diving Championships.

History
The national Italian Diving team participated to all the Summer Olympics editions, from Antwerp 1920, 21 times on 26.

Medal tables

Olympic Games

World Championships

European Championships

Multiple medalists

See also
Italy at the Olympics
Diving Summer Olympics medal table
List of World Aquatics Championships medalists in diving
Italy national swimming team

References

External links
Italy Diving at Summer Olympics
 Tuffi at the Italian Swimming Federation web site

Diving